The Potholes Reservoir is part of the Columbia Basin Irrigation Project. It is formed by the O'Sullivan Dam and located in central Washington, in the United States. The reservoir is fed by water from Moses Lake, part of the Crab Creek basin.

The area features several lakes (typically 30-70 yards wide and 10–30 feet deep). These lakes, known as "potholes" were created through both natural and man made processes. The potholes were initially carved out during the Pleistocene by flood waters originating from Glacial Lake Missoula. Subsequent damming of the area by the Columbia Basin Project raised the water table high enough to allow these topographical depressions to become lakes.

Recreation
On the shore of the reservoir is Potholes State Park, a  member of the Washington State Park System.  It has  of shoreline on the reservoir.

Fishing
There are many types of fish inside of the reservoir, including:
Largemouth bass
Smallmouth bass
Rainbow trout
Walleye
Black crappie
Yellow perch
Bluegill
Lake whitefish
Carp
Steelhead

References

External links
Potholes Reservoir Unit Washington Department of Fish and Wildlife
Potholes Reservoir Resource Management Plan U.S. Department of the Interior
Potholes Reservoir Fishing Washington Department of Fish and Wildlife

Reservoirs in Washington (state)
Lakes of Grant County, Washington
Moses Lake, Washington